Stereodermus is a genus of primitive weevils in the beetle family Brentidae. There are more than 40 described species in Stereodermus.

Species
These 47 species belong to the genus Stereodermus:

 Stereodermus angularis Mantilleri, 2005
 Stereodermus artificialis (Kleine, 1923)
 Stereodermus attenuatus Mantilleri & Sforzi, 2006
 Stereodermus barbirostris Sharp, 1895
 Stereodermus barclayi Mantilleri, 2004
 Stereodermus bartolozzii Mantilleri, 2005
 Stereodermus breviceps Sharp, 1895
 Stereodermus calvus Sharp, 1895
 Stereodermus carinatus Sharp, 1895
 Stereodermus chontalensis Sharp, 1895
 Stereodermus congruens (Kleine, 1925)
 Stereodermus denisi Mantilleri & Sforzi, 2006
 Stereodermus dentipennis Sharp, 1895
 Stereodermus dentipes Sharp, 1895
 Stereodermus effrenatus (Kleine, 1927)
 Stereodermus eliseannae Mantilleri, 2004
 Stereodermus elytralis Senna, 1903
 Stereodermus exilis Suffrian, 1870
 Stereodermus explanatus Mantilleri & Sforzi, 2006
 Stereodermus ferox (Kleine, 1944)
 Stereodermus fessus Kleine, 1927
 Stereodermus filum Sharp, 1895
 Stereodermus flavotibialis Kleine, 1922
 Stereodermus fucosus (Kleine, 1925)
 Stereodermus gestroi Senna, 1893
 Stereodermus godmani Sharp, 1895
 Stereodermus imparicostatus Mantilleri & Sforzi, 2006
 Stereodermus jonathani Mantilleri, 2004
 Stereodermus latirostris Sharp, 1895
 Stereodermus leucomystax Mantilleri, 2012
 Stereodermus longiceps Sharp, 1895
 Stereodermus maelae Mantilleri, 2004
 Stereodermus micropterus Mantilleri
 Stereodermus mitratus Sharp, 1895
 Stereodermus nathaliae Mantilleri, 2004
 Stereodermus nigriceps Sharp, 1895
 Stereodermus olivieri Mantilleri, 2004
 Stereodermus papuanus Goossens, 2008
 Stereodermus paulettae Mantilleri & Sforzi, 2006
 Stereodermus platycornis Mantilleri
 Stereodermus pseudocongruens Mantilleri, 2005
 Stereodermus puncticollis Sharp, 1895
 Stereodermus pygmaeus (Gyllenhal, 1833)
 Stereodermus raapi Senna, 1897
 Stereodermus similis Mantilleri & Sforzi, 2006
 Stereodermus siporanus Senna, 1898
 Stereodermus zunilensis Sharp, 1895

References

Further reading

 
 
 
 

Brentidae
Articles created by Qbugbot